"Cry Baby Cry" is a song by American rock band Santana from their nineteenth studio album, All That I Am (2005). The song features Jamaican singer and songwriter Sean Paul and English singer and songwriter Joss Stone, and was released as the album's third and final single. It was written by Lester Mendez, Sean Paul, Kara DioGuardi, and Jimmy Harry.

Song information
"Cry Baby Cry" was the third US single and the second international single from Santana's album All That I Am. The song is also included as a bonus track on the 2006 special edition of Sean Paul's third studio album, The Trinity (2005).

The single was released in the United Kingdom on May 8, 2006, and was the biggest hit from Santana's album, despite peaking at number seventy-one on the UK Singles Chart and spending only one week inside it. However, it fared better than the previous single, "Just Feel Better", which missed the chart completely. It was the smallest hit from Paul's album though and his first single to miss the UK top forty, as well as the first single to miss the top forty for Stone.

Music video
The music video, directed by Chris Robinson, features Santana playing the guitar, Sean Paul in a black wall singing, and footage of women crying (including actress Dania Ramirez). Stone does not appear in the video.

Track listing
CD single
"Cry Baby Cry"   – 3:53
"Con Santana"   – 3:20
"Cry Baby Cry"   – 3:51
"Cry Baby Cry"

Charts

References

2005 songs
2006 singles
Arista Records singles
Joss Stone songs
Music videos directed by Chris Robinson (director)
Santana (band) songs
Sean Paul songs
Song recordings produced by Lester Mendez
Songs written by Jimmy Harry
Songs written by Kara DioGuardi
Songs written by Lester Mendez
Songs written by Sean Paul